Mount Fairview can refer to:

 An alternate name for Fairview Mountain (Alberta) in Alberta, Canada
 Mount Fairview (Colorado) in Custer County, Colorado